The Best Years is a 2007 Canadian teen drama series set in Boston, Massachusetts

The Best Years may also refer to:

Film 
 The Best Two Years, film written and directed by Scott S. Anderson
 The Best Years (2014 film), a Northern Irish film
 The Best Years (2020 film), an Italian film

Television series 
 List of The Best Years episodes

Science Fiction 
 The Year's Best Science Fiction, series of science fiction anthologies

Music
The Best of Five Years, a 2008 compilation album by Mortification 
Best of the Chrysalis Years, a compilation album by The Ramones
The Best of the Decca Years, a 2009 compilation album by The Kingston Trio
The Best of the Epic Years, a 2009 compilation album by The Stranglers
The Best of the Private Years, a 2009 compilation album by Taj Mahal
The Best of the Vanguard Years (disambiguation), the name of several compilation albums
Very Best of the Relix Years, a 2009 compilation album by New Riders of the Purple Sage

See also
The Best Years of Our Lives (disambiguation)
Best of the Early Years (disambiguation)

it:I migliori anni